Vortex, previously known as Chalet, was a class of spy satellite operated by the United States during the 1980s and 1990s to collect signals intelligence (SIGINT) from high Earth orbit.  The Vortex satellites were operated by the National Reconnaissance Office for the United States Air Force and listened to radio transmissions originating from Earth or space.  The intercepted data is believed to have been fed into and analyzed by the National Security Agency ECHELON system.

The satellites each had a mass of approximately 1,800 kilograms and are operated from non-stationary geosynchronous orbits.  Each reportedly carried a 38-meter-diameter umbrella-like reflecting dish to collect radio signals from Earth.  At least six launch attempts were made of Chalet/Vortex satellites between 1978 and 1989. The Chalet/Vortex satellites replaced the older generation of Canyon satellites, and were superseded by the larger, more capable Mercury satellites.

Launches

 * – The rockets used for the first three launches also included Transtages, however it was considered an integral component of the  rocket, and an additional upper stage for  launches.

See also
Magnum SIGINT satellites – a similar, contemporary program run for the Central Intelligence Agency
Mercury or "Advanced Vortex" SIGINT satellites – replacements for Vortex

References
Richelson, Jeffrey T. ed. U.S. Military Uses of Space, 1945-1991 Vol 1, Guide. National Security Archive. 1991.

External links
Vortex satellite drawing
SIGINT satellite overeview  from Federation of American Scientists
List of SIGINT satellites from FAS
Jonathan's space report No 369  (1998-08-22)
Vortex/Chalet history from Encyclopedia Astronautica
Launch log from Jonathan's Space Report

National Reconnaissance Office satellites
Signals intelligence satellites
Military equipment introduced in the 1970s